The Battle of Albuquerque was a small engagement of the American Civil War in April 1862 between General Henry Hopkins Sibley's Army of New Mexico and a Union Army under Edward R. S. Canby.

Battle
The Confederates were on the retreat from New Mexico Territory after the Battle of Glorieta Pass. On April 8, Sibley's 4th, 5th and 7th Texas Mounted Volunteers occupied Albuquerque for a second time as they retreated southeast to Texas. Colonel Canby moved his army up from Fort Craig to ascertain the strength of the Confederates in Albuquerque.

Canby's artillery opened fire at long range from the edge of town for two days.  The Union artillery ceased firing when a local citizen informed Canby the Confederates would not permit the civilians to seek shelter.  Canby felt he had accomplished his mission; he knew the Rebels were still willing to put up resistance.  The Union demonstration also caused Colonel Tom Green to hastily pull out of Santa Fe and move to Sibley's aid, hoping to counter attack in the morning.  Under cover of darkness Canby's forces slipped away without the rebels' knowledge.

Lacking the resources to take a large force captive, Canby hoped the Confederates would concentrate their forces together and move out of New Mexico in one unit.  The rebels did indeed end their occupation of Albuquerque a few days later on April 12.  Sibley left behind the sick and wounded along with eight mountain howitzers, buried near the edge of town.

Notes

References
Alberts, Don E., & Frazer, Donald S. Battle of Glorieta, Texas A&M University Press, July 2000, 
Eicher, John H., & Eicher, David J.: Civil War High Commands, Stanford University Press, 2001, .
Heyman, Max L., Jr.: Prudent Soldier: A Biography of Major General ERS Canby, 1817-1873, Frontier Military Series III, Glendale, CA: The Arthur H. Clark Co., 1959.
Filson Historical Society Library: MS #118. "Canby, Edward Richard Sprigg, 1819[sic]-1873. Papers, 1837-1873." A\C214 (1 box, 146 items; includes contemporary newspaper accounts regarding General Canby's death and its aftermath).
Military biography of Henry Hopkins Sibley from the Cullum biographies
[www.sangres.com/history/civilwarnm.htm www.sangres.com/history/civilwarnm.htm]

Albuquerque
Albuquerque
Albuquerque
Albuquerque
Events in Albuquerque, New Mexico
April 1862 events
1862 in New Mexico Territory